Accident is a 2013 Nigerian thriller drama film produced and directed by Teco Benson and starring Kalu Ikeagwu and Chioma Chukwuka. It won the Best Nigerian Film award at the 10th Africa Movie Academy Awards. It also has 3 nominations at the 2014 Nigeria Entertainment Awards. Its story revolves around the life of a female lawyer who is approached by a client seeking divorce with low-sexual satisfaction from partner as reason. An unexpected event occur leading to several consequences.

Cast
Chioma Chukwuka as Chy
Kalu Ikeagwu as Don
Frederick Leonard as Chike
Wale Macaulay as Pros Counsel
Cassandra Odita as Angela's mum
Bukky Babalola as Ada
Eric Anderson
George Davidson
Tope Osoba

See also
 List of Nigerian films of 2013

References

2013 films
English-language Nigerian films
2013 thriller drama films
Nigerian thriller drama films
Best Nigerian Film Africa Movie Academy Award winners
2013 drama films
2010s English-language films